Fabien Antunes (born 19 November 1991) is a French professional footballer who plays as a midfielder for Greek Super League club Ionikos.

Personal life
Antunes is of Portuguese descent.

Career statistics

References

External links
 

Living people
1991 births
Association football fullbacks
French footballers
French people of Portuguese descent
Championnat National players
Belgian Pro League players
Challenger Pro League players
Super League Greece players
JA Drancy players
Red Star F.C. players
R.E. Virton players
K.V. Oostende players
Panetolikos F.C. players
Ionikos F.C. players
Sint-Truidense V.V. players
K.V.C. Westerlo players
French expatriate footballers
French expatriate sportspeople in Belgium
French expatriate sportspeople in Greece
Expatriate footballers in Belgium
Expatriate footballers in Greece